Saint Luke's United Church is located at 353 Sherbourne Street (on the southeast corner of Carlton and Sherbourne Streets) in Toronto, Ontario, Canada. Originally built across the street from the old site of Toronto General Hospital, it is now across from Allan Gardens. The building was originally home to Sherbourne Street Methodist Church, later Sherbourne United. It merged with Carlton Street United in 1959 to create St. Luke's. Sherbourne was founded in 1872, while Carlton originated in 1832.

History
The church was built in 1887 as the Sherbourne Street Methodist Church by Toronto architects Langley & Burke, who used a Richardsonian Romanesque style. The church was built with a sanctuary that seats 800 and was called “the millionaires’ church” because its congregation was drawn from Toronto's most prestigious neighbourhood. The Church's attendance declined after its merger into the United Church of Canada in the 1920s, reaching approximately 200 in 2022.

Community use

The church building houses many different types of rooms to accommodate various activities, including: the main sanctuary, a chapel, a gymnasium, two kitchens, a few administrative offices, some meeting rooms, and a formal parlor. As a result of this diversity of space, the church has become a community center that hosts functions for the general public. Concerts are held in the church from time to time, and several musical groups use the building as a space for practice. Dance groups and theater troupes are also tenants of the building. Some non-profit organizations including: Alcoholics Anonymous, abuse prevention programs, continuing education programs and food banks use the church's meeting and kitchen spaces to benefit the community. Several sports groups including a fencing club, and martial arts group train in the gymnasium on a regular basis. The church also displays pride flags and is open to all; it even hosts a dance group geared toward the gay community.

As of May 2022, the church was being renovated as part of the United Church's Kindred Works project to renovate underused churches to provide community housing. KPMB Architects, the lead designers on the project, plans to keep the original building from 1887, but largely demolish later additions to make room for a 12-story building with 100 units.

Congregations
The main sanctuary and chapel currently are host to seven different worship groups, six of which are culturally different Christian denominations, and the other being a Buddhist meditation circle. St. Luke's has actually hosted up to nine different congregations simultaneously in the past. In addition to the United Church of Canada, other congregations that use the building include the Berea Seventh-day Adventist Church, the Sheep Flock Korean Presbyterian Church, and several other congregations and community groups.

See also
List of United Church of Canada churches in Toronto

References

External links 
 church website

United Church of Canada churches in Toronto
Seventh-day Adventist churches in Canada
Romanesque Revival church buildings in Canada
Churches completed in 1872
19th-century Methodist church buildings
19th-century churches in Canada